Yahya Abdulrahman Al-Hamud (born 1960) is a Saudi politician and Governor of Bareq since April 2016. He has previously served as a member of the 'Asir Region communal council.

Early life
Al-Hamud is from Ash Shaaf, Asir and belongs to the Shahran Tribe. Grandson of "Ibn Hamud", Sheikh of Shahran. He was born in 1960. He did his early education in Abha, and holds a certificate in Planning, Public Administration and Project Management from King Abdulaziz University.

See also 
Bareq
Saudi Arabia
 'Asir Region
 History of Bariq
 Mohammed bin Saud Al-Mathami

References

Living people
King Abdulaziz University alumni
1960 births